Events from the year 1769 in Sweden

Incumbents
 Monarch – Adolf Frederick

Events
 May - The Riksdag of the Estates assemble in Norrköping, the Caps (party)-government fall, and the Riksdag move to Stockholm. 
 30 May – Claes Ekeblad appointed Privy Council Chancellery.
 
 
 
 October – Prussia, Russia and Denmark form an alliance in order to preserve the current Swedish political system to keep Sweden unstable. 
 
 Swea rikes historia by Sven Lagerbring

Births

 2 February - Maria Franck, actress  (died 1847)
 19 August - Ulrica Eleonora Rålamb, politically active countess and spy (died 1847)
 
 
 
 
 date unknown - Ebba Morman, actress  (died 1802)

Deaths
 
 5 February – Cajsa Warg, cook book writer (born 1703)
 
 
 
 
 

 28 June - Elisabeth Stierncrona, writer (born 1714)
 Jean Grossaint De la Roche-yon, spy (born 1713)

References

 
Years of the 18th century in Sweden
Sweden